Megalophota is a monotypic snout moth genus described by George Hampson in 1918. Its only species, Megalophota leonella, described in the same article, is found in Sierra Leone.

The wingspan is about 20 mm. The forewings are ochreous white irrorated (sprinkled) with brown, the costal area slightly irrorated to near the apex. The hindwings are ochreous white.

References

Moths described in 1918
Phycitinae
Monotypic moth genera
Moths of Africa